The Civil Procedure Code of Romania is the law regulating civil procedure in Romania. It came into force on 15 February 2013 as Law no. 134/2010, implemented through Law no. 76/2012, replacing the old Civil Procedure Code of 1865. As a transitional measure, some of the Code's provisions came into force on 1 January 2016.

Background and implementation
The civil procedure code is the result of a major legal reform which began in the mid-2000s, prior to Romania's accession to the European Union. It was designed in such a way as to simplify and accelerate civil proceedings, following repeated condemnations of Romania by the European Court of Human Rights for breaching the standards of a fair civil trial as established by the ECHR. To this end, new mechanisms were introduced to ensure an optimal and predictable duration of trials, as well as remedying a perceived inconsistency of Romanian case law. 

The code came into force two years after a new civil code was also implemented, and thus it also aimed to align civil proceedings with the new substantive law.

Despite a number of transitional issues, the 2015 Cooperation and Verification Mechanism report on Romania found that the new codes led to a decline in trial length to an average of 1.5 years. According to the same report there was also a reduction in the judiciary's overall workload, with tribunals and courts of appeal experiencing a 17% decline in the number of cases.

Contents
The code comprises a preliminary title and seven books (cărţi) which include provisions on contentious and non-contentious proceedings, arbitration, enforcement, special procedures (such as divorce and partition) and international civil lawsuits. The books are further divided into titles, chapters and sections.

See also
Law of Romania
Civil code of Romania

References

Law of Romania
Romania
2013 in Romania
2013 in law